Killer: The Game of Assassination is a  live action role-playing game derived from the traditional assassin game. Created by American game designer Steve Jackson and first published in 1981 or 1982 by his own game company, Steve Jackson Games, Killer is one of the oldest set of rules having been officially published to play the assassin game.

Original editions 

At least four editions of the game were published in the United States, all of them by Steve Jackson Games:

 1st edition: 1981
 2nd edition: 1985
 3rd edition: 1992
 4th edition: 1998

Translations 
In 1991 the second edition Killer was translated into Spanish by the Spanish game company Joc Internacional. In 1994 there was also an Italian translation.

Reviews
Challenge #70
Jeux & Stratégie #13
Jeux & Stratégie #57

See also 
 Steve Jackson Games
 Assassin (game)

References

External links 
 Killer: The Game of Assassination description page in the Steve Jackson Games website

Steve Jackson (American game designer) games
Live-action role-playing games
Steve Jackson Games games
Role-playing games introduced in 1981